Dexter Township may refer to the following places in the United States:

 Dexter Township, Cowley County, Kansas
 Dexter Township, Michigan
 Dexter Township, Minnesota

Township name disambiguation pages